Rick West may refer to:
 Rick West (sailor), Master Chief Petty Officer of the US Navy
 Rick C. West, Canadian arachnologist
 Rick West (Oklahoma politician), member of the Oklahoma House of Representatives
 Rick West (Virginia politician), mayor of Chesapeake, Virginia

See also
 Richard West (disambiguation)